The Texas Longhorns women's basketball team represents the University of Texas at Austin in NCAA Division I intercollegiate women's basketball competition. The Longhorns compete in the Big 12 Conference.

Under head coach Jody Conradt, the second NCAA Division I basketball coach to win 900 career games (after Tennessee's Pat Summitt), the Longhorns won the 1986 national championship. Conradt retired after the 2006–07 season, and was replaced by Duke head coach Gail Goestenkors. She resigned after five seasons and was replaced by Karen Aston, whose contract was not renewed following the 2019–20 season. In April 2020, Vic Schaefer was named the program's fifth head coach.

From 1977 to 2022, Texas women's basketball played its home games in the Frank Erwin Special Events Center, where the team compiled a 576–118 (.830) record. The final game played in the Erwin Center was an NCAA second-round victory over Utah, 78–56, on March 20, 2022. The start of the 2022–23 season will see the team play in the $388 million Moody Center.

History

The University of Texas held its first basketball competition in 1900, six years before Magnus Mainland started the men's team at Texas. The games in the first few years were intramural. By 1906, the school was playing other institutions, although only home games, not off-campus. Full varsity intercollegiate competition in women's basketball began in 1974. Through the 2021–22 season, the Longhorns rank sixth in total victories and eighth in all-time win percentage among all NCAA Division I women's college basketball programs, with an all-time win–loss record of 1161–424.

The Longhorns have won 22 total conference championships (12 regular-season conference titles and 10 conference tournament titles) in women's basketball and have made 33 total appearances in the NCAA tournament (49–32 overall record), reaching the NCAA Final Four three times (1986, 1987, 2003) and the NCAA regional finals (Elite Eight) 10 times. Texas won the 1986 NCAA Championship to finish the 1985–86 season with a 34–0 record. Through the 2021–22 season, Texas ranks 10th in all-time NCAA Tournament victories (48), trailing Connecticut (130), Tennessee (128), Stanford (99), Notre Dame (69), Louisiana Tech (65), Duke (61), Georgia (58), Baylor (54) and North Carolina (49).

Early years (1900–1966)

The very first women's basketball games occurred in 1892, at Smith College, under the direction of Senda Berenson Abbott. Shortly thereafter, Clara Baer brought the game to Louisiana. The details of how the game came to Texas is not known for certain, but in 1900, Eleanore Norvell organized the first basketball game at the University of Texas. Norvell was originally from Oklahoma, and came to Texas to direct the physical education department. She has been at Texas for less than a year when she introduced basketball to students at the school. The first recorded game occurred on Saturday January 13, 1900. The teams played four ten-minute quarters—the final score of that first game was 3–2.

Although the men's game and women's game both had their roots in the Naismith rules, the first set of rules left a lot to be specified, and the rules for the women's game developed differently than for the men. Both Senda Berensen and Clara Baer used Naismith's rules as an inspiration, but developed their own set of rules, including marked areas on the court limiting the movement of players to their respective sections. Some of these rules were motivated by the prevailing assumptions of "female frailty and dependence".

Texas would play limited intercollegiate basketball between 1903 and 1921. Eunice Aden was captain of the basketball team in 1903, took over coaching duties in 1905 and became director of physical education in 1911. Opportunities in basketball grew, but only in a limited way. Intercollegiate play existed, but the school did not allow off-campus games. When Aden retired in 1921, she was replaced by Anna Hiss, who would run the physical education department until 1957. While she was called a visionary for her role in directing physical education and intramurals, she was "dead-set against intercollegiate athletics for women". The limited intercollegiate play under Aden came to an end, with basketball now limited to intramurals and interclass play.

The ascension of Hiss to the head of the department roughly coincided with the influence of Lou Henry Hoover, First Lady of the United States. In 1923, Hoover was head of the Girl Scouts of the United States. Although Hoover was an advocate of sports, she felt that highly competitive sports were detrimental. Hoover helped to found the Women's Division of the National Amateur Athletic Foundation (WDNAAF). This foundation passed a resolution in 1925 banning extramural competition. The following year, Hiss formed an organization which voted "condemn intercollegiate competition for women, and to endorse the intramural/interclass model".

Hiss supported many activities, including tennis, golf, archery, swimming and interpretive dance, but was opposed to team sports. In general, "artistry was favored over athleticism". She led an unsuccessful protest against American woman participation in the Olympics of 1928, 1932, and 1936. She was the driving force behind the construction of a Women's Gymnasium (named in her honor after her death). While it was a substantial resource for women's athletics, it was designed to fit her beliefs—the courts were too small for a proper basketball game, and had no room for spectators and the swimming pool was deliberately shorter than Olympic length.

While basketball was not officially supported as a school-sponsored sport in the 1920s and 30s, it was still played by many groups. The interclass games were de-emphasized, but fraternities and sororities played the game, as well as organizations such as the YWCA, industrial leagues and AAU teams.

Intermediate years (1967-1974)
After Hiss's departure, basketball at Texas began to grow, although it would be almost a decade until it became a full varsity sport. The University of Texas Sports Association (UTSA) a predecessor to the athletic department, organized the sports available for women. Basketball was not one of the club sports offered until a student, Mary Neikirk, organized a petition which was presented to the administration. The school agreed to add basketball as a club sport under the auspices of the UTSA.

The first year's budget was $100. A team was formed, and the team played under the girl's rules of the era—six players on a team, two of whom stayed at the defensive end, two of whom stayed in the offensive end and two, called "rovers" who could play both ends. These rules were used until 1971, at which time they switched to "boy's rules".

In 1973, the team practiced and played in the annex of Gregory Gymnasium. Rodney Page, who had some experience as a women's basketball assistant coach, was a referee at one of the games. When the current coach of the team quit, Page was hired. The Texas team, in Pages' first year, compiled a record of 7–11.

The 1974 season was a season of transition, with a mixture of firsts and lasts. This year's team was the first to play their games in Gregory Gymnasium itself, rather than the annex. This was the first year the team had trainers, and it was the first year that the Longhorn Band and cheerleaders performed for the team. It was their last year under the auspices of the UTSA. It was the last year before the sport attained the status of a full varsity sport.

Title IX was passed in 1972, with a provision prohibiting discrimination on the basis of sex. At the time it was passed, it was unknown what impact it would have on sports, including whether it even applied to intercollegiate sports. Two years, later, in 1974, the issue wasn't yet settled, with the Tower Amendment specifically excluding revenue-producing sports, but shortly thereafter, the Tower Amendment was eliminated. It was becoming clear that universities would have to respond sooner or later, but Texas responded in 1974. Shortly after the conclusion of the 1974 basketball season, Stephen Spurr, the University president, announced that a women's athletic department would be started, complete with offices, staff and a budget of $50,000.

Rod Page years (1974-1976)
Some schools waited for the Department of Health, Education and Welfare to provide specific regulations covering Title IX. These regulations would not be published until 1975. In 1974, Texas began offering varsity sports opportunities to female students in seven sports. In some ways, the University of Texas program became the envy of women at other schools, but the initial progress was relative. Two-thirds of the male athletes at Texas were on scholarship, while only one in fifteen female students were on scholarship. There were 21 male coach positions, almost all full-time, but seven women's coaches who were all part-time.

Under Page's leadership, the team improved upon their prior year results, with a record of 17–10. The team started out strong, winning their first five games, including an overtime win against Houston 63–62, before running into Baylor, who won easily 116–62. Some of the games were played as preliminaries to the men's games, but others were stand-alone games.

They would also lose their next game to Southwest Texas, on a night when fundraiser was held, with an exhibition match between UT All-Stars and the All American Red Heads Team, a barnstorming team of female basketball players. The team earned an invitation to the Texas AIAW post season tournament, as a second seed behind Southwest Texas. The tournament schedule required five games in three days. The Texas team did well, except against Southwest Texas, ending up with 17 victories against 10 losses, five of which were to Southwest Texas.

The following season, Texas team would achieve even more. The basketball team added Retha Swindell, a 6' 2" rebounder with defensive skills. The school also hired Donna Lopiano, who started what would become a 17-year stint as women's athletic director. She "vowed to have every Longhorn women's team in the top 10 and at least one national title within five years". While the school was expressing a commitment to women's varsity sports, not everyone was supportive. The football coach, Darrell Royal, had told President Ford that "Title IX might be the death of big-time college football.". Despite that concern, she managed to convince him to support her during her interview.

The team's first game was against Southwest Texas, the team that had defeated Texas five times in the previous season. This time, Texas would prevail 57–47 in a game held at their arena. The team lost three in a row as a result of sickness and injury, then responded with a twelve-game winning streak. The team would go on to a 21–7 season record.

Under Rod Page, the team had improved materially, so it was a surprise that when the Longhorns completed their regular season, and prepared for the post-season tournament, athletic director Lopiano announced he would not be continuing as coach of the team. The news came as a shock to Page and the team. The reason given was that the position was a head coach of basketball and volleyball—Page did not have volleyball experience. However, Lopiano had her eye on another coach, one she felt could lead the team to become a national contender.

Jody Conradt era (1976-2007)

Lopiano's choice was Jody Conradt, who was garnering national attention as the head coach at the University of Texas at Arlington. She turned a losing program around, and the 1975–76 team would compile a 23–11 record, despite materially strengthening their schedule of opponents at the same time. Two days after announcing that Page would not be returning, Lopiano announced that Conradt would be the coach starting with the next season. Conradt wasn't surprised that the team felt loyalty to Page, but she asked them to "have an open mind".

The first season under Conradt had a schedule of 46 games. The schedule included games in the Northeast, the first out-of-state trip for the team, and the first airplane ride for many of the players. To save money, the team stayed at the home of Lopiano's parents in Stamford, Connecticut. Texas lost badly to Queens College, then ranked No. 15 in the nation, but went on to the Penn State Invitational where they beat Penn State and Southern Connecticut, at that time a national power. Mel Greenberg, the organizer of the first top 25 women's poll, was in attendance. By the time the team returned to Austin, it learned of its first national ranking at No. 14. The team would complete its first season under Conradt with a record of 36–10.

Conradt coached both basketball and volleyball, but would give up volleyball duties after two seasons. The team would go on to become a dominant women's basketball team on the 1980s, ranked in the AP Top 10 for all but one year between 1979 and 1990.

Texas would end the 1984 and 1985 seasons with the No. 1 ranking according in the AP poll, but failed to win the national championship in either year. In 1984, they suffered injuries, in 1985, they went 28–3, but were upset in the NCAA tournament by Western Kentucky. 1986 would end differently. Again they achieved the AP No. 1 ranking, but they also went on to win every single game, achieving a record of 34–0, and posting the first undefeated season in women's basketball during the NCAA era (since 1982) and the fourth undefeated season in women's college basketball overall.

The 1987 season saw the previous year's NCAA Final Four MVP Clarissa Davis and 1988 Olympian Andrea Lloyd lead the team back to the Final Four, hosted in Austin, but the Lady Longhorns fell in the national semifinals 70-67 to longtime nemesis Louisiana Tech. Davis suffered a knee injury in the 1988 season, limiting her to action in just nine games, while the team rallied for another undefeated Southwest Conference championship season, SWC Tournament title, and No. 1 national seed in the NCAAs. Again, it was Louisiana Tech that ended the Longhorns' season—in Austin—with an 83-80 win in the Elite Eight.

Three recruiting arrivals in the fall of 1988 and fall of 1989 brought hopes to see Texas build a roster that would help return to the Final Four, with Catarina Pollini, a highly touted, 6-foot-5 European standout, and Vicki Hall, the Gatorade National Player of the Year, joining the program before the 1988–89 season. Pollini, a junior transfer, suffered a knee injury and missed 12 games before returning to limited action. At that time, an obscure NCAA rule revealed that if she played past her March 16 birthday that season, it would be considered an additional year of eligibility. Opting to help Davis in her senior season, the team reached the Elite Eight in the Austin Regional where it fell to Maryland 79–71. The next fall, the state of Texas' top recruit in years, Sheryl Swoopes arrived on campus, only to leave due to homesickness before classes started. Swoopes would go on to lead Texas Tech to the 1993 NCAA Championship as Final Four MVP and Naismith College Player of the Year. As for Hall, she earned SWC Freshman of the Year honors in 1989–90 and was Texas' leading scorer the next season as Texas managed a 14–2 finish in Southwest Conference play—including a road loss to Arkansas that ended a streak of 132 conference wins. The Longhorns then lost to Texas Tech in the SWC Tournament championship game and made a Round of 48 exit from the NCAA Tournament in a 77–63 home loss to Lamar. Against Missouri State in the opening game of the 1991–92 season, Hall tore her left ACL. Texas finished 11–3 in conference play (Arkansas had departed for the SEC) and again fell to Texas Tech in the SWC Tournament championship game. The Longhorns' opening game in the NCAA Tournament's round of 32 saw them fall to UCLA 72–71.

Facilities

Gregory Gymnasium
Originally built in 1930, Gregory Gymnasium was named after its main advocate and planner, Thomas Watt Gregory. An alumnus of the University, Gregory served on the University's Board of Regents and as United States Attorney General (1914–19) before the gym was built. Gregory Gymnasium is located on the UT central campus, a short distance southeast of the UT Main Building, Tower, and Main Mall and facing west onto Speedway Avenue, the campus's central north–south street.

The Texas women's basketball team played home games in the Gregory Gymnasium annex in the 1972–73 season and then in the Gymnasium itself beginning with the 1973–74 season until moving into the Special Events Center (later renamed the Frank Erwin Center) for the 1977–78 season.

Frank Erwin Center
The Texas women's basketball team opened the Frank Erwin Center on November 29, 1977 with a 67–64 victory over Temple College.

Built for a total cost of $34 million, the building was named for former UT alumnus and Board of Regents member Frank Erwin. Originally known as the Special Events Center, the facility was renamed in 1981 to honor Erwin, who had died that year. The Erwin Center was located at the southeastern corner of the UT central campus and was bounded on the west by Red River Street on the east by Interstate 35.

A two-level layout (the lower arena and upper mezzanine) accommodated up to 16,540 spectators for basketball games. UT undertook extensive renovations of the facility from 2001 to 2003 at a cost of $55 million, adding, among other things, new and renovated seating, new video and sound systems, new lighting, and 28 suites. As part of the project, UT constructed the Denton A. Cooley Pavilion, a state-of-the-art practice and training facility that sits adjacent to the Erwin Center.

The master plan released in 2013 for the University's new Dell Medical School indicated that the Erwin Center would be demolished in a later phase of construction within 6–15 years. The final basketball season played there was 2021–22, with the Moody Center opening the following spring.

Denton A. Cooley Pavilion
Built during the final phase of the renovation of the Erwin Center, the Denton A. Cooley Pavilion opened in the fall of 2003. The two-level, 44,000-square-foot building sits adjacent to the Erwin Center and serves as a state-of-the-art practice and training facility for the Texas men's and women's basketball teams. The Pavilion is named for Dr. Denton A. Cooley, a UT alumnus, basketball letterman (1939–41), and pioneering heart surgeon.

The Texas men's and women's basketball teams have separate 9,000-square-foot practice court areas, each consisting of one full-court and one half-court practice area with seven basket stations. The practice facility also includes a locker room with a players' lounge, an instructional film theater, a 4,100-square-foot strength and conditioning area, an athletic training and hydrotherapy area, an academic resource and activity center, and a coaches' lounge and locker room.

The Cooley Pavilion will be demolished and replaced during the same phase of construction of the Dell Medical School as the Erwin Center.

Moody Center
The $388 million Moody Center is a multi-purpose arena on the campus of the University of Texas. The replacement to the Frank Erwin Center was built on a former parking lot located immediately south of Mike A. Myers Soccer Stadium. The arena will seat 10,000+ for most basketball games and expand to 15,000+ seats for large basketball games and other events.

Year-by-year results

Championships

National championships

Conference championships

Postseason

NCAA tournament results
Texas has appeared in the NCAA tournament on 35 occasions (fourth-most appearances all time). The Longhorns' overall record in the tournament is 49–32.

NCAA tournament seeding history
The NCAA has seeded the Tournament since its inaugural year in 1982. Texas participated in the final AIAW women's basketball tournament in 1982 rather than the inaugural NCAA Tournament (falling in the AIAW Championship Game to Rutgers, 83–77); the Longhorns began participating in the NCAA Tournament in 1983. Texas has appeared in 35 of the 40 Tournaments held since 1983.

AIAW Division I
The Longhorns made three appearances in the AIAW National Division I basketball tournament, with a combined record of 6–3.

AP and Coaches Polls

Texas has been ranked in at least one of the final AP or Coaches Polls in 28 seasons since their introduction prior to the 1976–77 and 1985–86 seasons, respectively. The Longhorns have recorded 16 Top 10 finishes and 10 Top Five finishes in one or more of the final polls. As of March 2, 2017, Texas teams have been ranked in 587 of 822 total weekly AP Polls (71.4%) since the inception of the poll in the 1976–77 season (third all-time in AP Poll appearances), and in 445 of 687 total weekly Coaches Polls (64.8%) since the inception of the poll in the 1985–86 season.

All-time series records

All-time series records against Big 12 members

Texas women's basketball leads the all-time series against all Big 12 Conference opponents.

All-time series records against former Big 12 members
Texas women's basketball leads the all-time series against all former Big 12 Conference opponents. Texas holds a winning record against all former Big 12 members in games played in Big 12 competition.

All-time series records against non-Big 12 former SWC members
Texas leads all series against former Southwest Conference members who are not current members of the Big 12.

Individual honors, awards, and accomplishments

Retired numbers
The Longhorns retired their first number in program history on September 7, 2019. Kamie Ethridge’s number 33 was officially retired at halftime of a Texas–LSU football game, becoming the first female Longhorn athlete to receive this honor.

Clarissa Davis's number 24 was retired on March 8, 2020, at a pre-game ceremony during the Texas-Oklahoma State Women's Basketball game.

Honors, awards, and accomplishments by player

The individual honors, awards, and accomplishments listed in the succeeding subsections are aggregated by player in the following table. Players with only all-conference honors (other than conference player of the year) or lower than first-team All-America honors are not included.

Women's Basketball Hall of Fame

Four Longhorn women's basketball players have been inducted into the Women's Basketball Hall of Fame in Knoxville, Tennessee.

National honors and awards (players)

National Player of the Year

Three Texas players have won one or more of the widely recognized National Player of the Year awards on four occasions.

All-America honors

Eleven Texas basketball players have received All-America honors on 19 occasions. Seven Texas players have received first-team All-America honors in 11 seasons, with two Longhorn players having been selected as a first-team All-American twice and one player having been selected three times.

Conference honors and awards (players)

Conference Player of the Year

Five Texas players have won conference player of the year honors on six occasions—all in the Southwest Conference. One Longhorn player has won Big 12 Player of the Year honors, and two players have won Big 12 Defensive Player of the Year honors.

First-team all-conference honors

Twenty-five Texas women's basketball players have received first-team all-conference honors on 48 occasions. Of these 25 players, ten have received first-team all-conference honors in two seasons, five players have received them in three seasons, and one player has received them in all four seasons.

First-team All-Southwest Conference

First-team All-Big 12 Conference

Freshman Player of the Year

Ten Longhorn freshmen women's basketball players have won conference freshman of the year honors—six players in the Southwest Conference and four players in the Big 12 Conference.

Southwest Conference Freshman of the Year

Big 12 Conference Freshman of the Year

Conference tournament most valuable player

Nine Longhorn women's basketball players have won conference tournament most valuable player honors on 10 occasions.

Southwest Conference tournament Most Outstanding Player

Big 12 Conference tournament Most Valuable Player

Professional basketball

WNBA Draft history

As of November 4, 2021, 19 Longhorn women's basketball players have been selected in the WNBA draft since the inaugural draft in 1997. Of these, six were selected in the first round, two were selected in the second round, seven were selected in the third round, and two were selected in the fourth round.

WNBA players

As of the 2020 WNBA season, 22 Texas players have played in the WNBA in league history. Four Longhorn players currently play in the WNBA.

All-time WNBA players

Current WNBA players

American Basketball League (1996–98) players

Six Longhorn players played in the ABL.

All-time ABL players

Olympians

Five Longhorn women's basketball players have competed in the Olympic Games in women's basketball, with three players winning gold medals and one player winning a bronze medal. Longhorn alumna Nell Fortner was head coach of gold medal-winning United States teams in 1996 and 2000. Former Longhorn coach Gail Goestenkors was an assistant coach for the United States team that won a gold medal in 2008.

Coaching honors and awards

Hall of Fame inductions

In October 1998, Jody Conradt became the second women's basketball coach to be inducted into the Naismith Memorial Basketball Hall of Fame in Springfield, Massachusetts. Conradt was also a member of the inaugural class elected to the Women's Basketball Hall of Fame in Knoxville, Tennessee in June 1999.

National Coach of the Year honors

Conradt won the WBCA National Coach of the Year Award following her 1984 season at Texas, in which her team posted a 32–3 overall record and reached the Elite Eight of the NCAA Tournament, and following the 1986 season, in which her team finished undefeated and won the NCAA championship.

Conference Coach of the Year honors

Jody Conradt was recognized as the Southwest Conference Coach of the Year for the 1984, 1985, 1987, 1988, and 1996 seasons and as the Big 12 Conference Coach of the Year for the 2003 and 2004 seasons. Karen Aston was named Big 12 Conference Coach of the Year in 2017. Vic Schaefer was named Big 12 Conference Coach of the Year in 2023.

See also
 1986 NCAA Division I women's basketball tournament
 Texas Longhorns men's basketball

Notes

References

External links